Clinic of Horrors is a webcomic created by Merryweather and PokuriMio and published on WEBTOON with 66 million views in 2022. The webcomic tells the story of the nurse Bianca Abercrombie, who works on Albright Clinic, a place that treats strange and supernatural diseases in a dystopian society.

In 2022, Clinic of Horrors has received Ringo Awards for Fan Favorite New Series.

References

Webtoons